2050 is a 2018 American independent science fiction drama film directed by Princeton Holt and starring Dean Cain, Stormi Maya, and Stefanie Bloom.  It premiered on November 16, 2018 at the Williamsburg Independent Film Festival and was released theatrically on March 1, 2019. It was distributed by ANERKE.

The film received mixed reviews and won 16 awards, including those for cinematography, writing, and VFX. It was also an official selection at the Berlin Sci-Fi Film Festival, Other World's Austin Film Festival, and Boston Sci-Fi Film Festival.

Plot 
Michael Green (David Vaughn), married, a video game designer and father of two, is struggling to find intimacy with his wife (Irina Abraham).  Upon discovering his brother-in-law Drew (Devin Fuller) has purchased a customizable sex robot, he turns to the warehouse run by Maxwell (Dean Cain) to create his own perfect mate.

Cast 
 Dean Cain as Maxwell
 Stormi Maya as Quin
 Stefanie Bloom as Sophia
 Devin Fuller as Drew
 David Vaughn as Michael Greene
 Irina Abraham as Brooke Greene
 Hope Blackstock as Alli
 Jonathan Ercolino as Cameron
 Jace Nicole as Diana
 Shannone Holt as Reign Regan
 Chris Riquinha as David

Production and release 
Filming wrapped in January 2018 and was director Princeton Holt's third film. Frequent collaborators, many of the producers also performed additional roles: Holt directed, Ackley wrote, and Vaughn and Riquinha acted. The team expressed feeling surrounded by an "unusually supportive group of investors" while working on this project. Post production was slated to wrap in March 2018.

First premiering at the Williamsburg Independent Film Festival on November 17, 2018, 2050 opened theatrically on March 1, 2019 in Los Angeles and performed well, keeping pace with blockbuster hits such as How to Train Your Dragon during its first weekend, and was subsequently held over an additional week before making its way to other select cities.

Reception 
Kyle Jonathan of The Movie Sleuth describes 2050 as being "one of the first beautiful disasters of the year," applauding the camerawork, premise, and acting.  In an article for the LA Times, Noel Murray commented, "To their credit, Holt and his co-writer Brian Ackley have created a realistic near-future world on a budget."

The film won the award for Most Provocative Film at the 2019 Boston Science Fiction Film Festival.

References

External links 
 
 
 

2018 films
2018 independent films
2010s English-language films
2010s science fiction drama films
American independent films
American science fiction drama films
2010s American films